Navin Yavapolkul (born February 8, 1979) is a Thai singer, actor and lecturer of Kasetsart University.

Biography 
Navin Yavapolkul or Navin Tar was born February 8, 1979, in Bangkok, Thailand.  He graduated from Kasetsart University (First class honors) with a Bachelor of Economic., Oregon State University and University of California, Davis). After Navin Tar graduated PhD University of California, Davis). He is lecturer at Kasetsart University. He teach Mathematics for Economists and Microeconomics.

Now Navin Tar interested in Triathlon. He joined triathlon.

He married with Passawee Payakbud on March 25, 2017 He has daughter name Pinnava Yavapolkul nickname Luca.

Academic Works 
 Post–Uruguay Round price linkages between developed and developing countries: the case of rice and wheat markets.

Discography

Sololist Albums 
 Navin Tar (1997)
 Muan Dem Team Namkheng (1998)
 Variety (1998)
 Chuanchim (2000)

Filmography

Commercials 
 Oralmate (1999)
 Brand (2000)
 Klear Shampoo (2013)
 Userreen(2014)
 Suzuki Ciaz(2015)
 Minere (2016)
 Sunplay (2016)

Awards And Achievement

References 

Navin Yavapolkul
Navin Yavapolkul
Navin Yavapolkul
Living people
1979 births
Navin Yavapolkul
University of California, Davis alumni
Navin Yavapolkul